Anthony Osei Kwadwo (born 31 October 1972 in Kumasi), known as Anthony Mensah, is a former Ghanaian football goalkeeper.

Career
Mensah used this name whilst playing for Asante Kotoko FC. He won the best defender Award as the goalkeeper for Asante Kotoko FC in the 1993/1994 football season.

International
Mensah was a member of the Men's National Team that won the bronze medal at the 1992 Summer Olympics in Barcelona, Spain.

Coaching career
He is currently a football coach for a youth club in the United States in Cincinnati, Ohio. As well as a goalkeeper coach at Indian Hill High School.

References

External links
 
 
 

1972 births
Living people
Ghanaian footballers
Asante Kotoko S.C. players
Footballers at the 1992 Summer Olympics
Olympic footballers of Ghana
Olympic bronze medalists for Ghana
Footballers from Kumasi
Olympic medalists in football
Medalists at the 1992 Summer Olympics
Association football goalkeepers